Abeona Mons is a mountain on Venus named after the goddess Abeona.

Surface features of Venus
Mountains on Venus